Gita Piramal (born 1954) is an Indian writer and business historian.

Education
Gita Piramal was educated in the United Kingdom. Higher education was through India's Bombay University. She holds a PhD in business history (1988), Masters in History (1981), Bachelor of Art in History of the West (1977).

Career
Gita Piramal is a Senior Associate Fellow at Somerville College, University of Oxford. Her primary research area is Indian business and its history. She has worked as an entrepreneur and businesswoman, a journalist and writer.

As an entrepreneur and businesswoman, Gita founded The Smart Manager (2002-2012), a management magazine, headed ERGO (2005-2012), a furniture manufacturer, and was a director of VIP Luggage (1990-2005). Gita is currently a non-executive board member of Bajaj Auto, Bajaj Finance, Bajaj Finserv and Bajaj Holdings & Investments. Her own companies have interests in real estate.

In media, Gita conceptualized and created content for three programs for CNBC-TV18. She scripted, edited, and featured or anchored over 100 television documentaries, as well as contributing over 1,500 articles for international and Indian publications.

Published writings

Books
 ‘Kamalnayan Bajaj - Architect of the Bajaj Group'. Kamalnayan Bajaj Charitable Trust Book. Pune. 2015
 ‘The Quotable Tycoon’ with David Olive. Penguin Books India, New Delhi, 2008
 ‘Managing Radical Change’ with Sumantra Ghoshal and Christopher Bartlett. Penguin Books India. Delhi. 2000.
 ‘Business Mantras’ with Aparna Piramal, Radhika Piramal and Mukund Beriwala. Penguin Books India. Delhi. 1999.
 ‘Business Legend’. Penguin Books India. Delhi. 1998.
 ‘Business Maharajas’. Penguin Books India. Delhi. 1997.
 ‘India’s Industrialists’ with Margaret Herdeck. Three Continents Press, Washington. 1985

Book chapters
 ‘The Bombay Plan and the Frustrations of Sir Ardeshir Dalal'. Chapter in Sanjaya Baru (ed). ‘The Bombay Plan’.   Rupa Publications. 2018.
 ‘Ratan Tata’ and ‘J.R.D.Tata’ chapters in ‘The Tata Saga’. Penguin, 2018.
 ‘Animal Spirits: Stray Thoughts on the Nature of Entrepreneurship in India's Business Families after Liberalization'. Chapter in Rakesh Mohan (ed). 'India Transformed: 25 Years of Economic Reforms'. Penguin Random House India. 2017.
 'Dhirubhai Ambani', 'Rahul Bajaj', 'Ratan Tata' and 'Walchand Hirachand'. Chapters in ‘The Portfolio Book of  Great Indian Business Stories: Riveting Tales of Business Leaders and Their Times’. New Delhi: Penguin Books India Pvt Ltd. 2015.
 ‘Succession Planning Under The Banyan Tree'. Chapter in ‘Business Standard 2008’. BS Books, New Delhi, 2008.
 ‘The Old Fox'. Chapter in ‘The Non-Fiction Collection: 20 Years of Penguin India’. Volume 3, Penguin Books India, New Delhi, 2007.
 ‘The Elixir of Entrepreneurship’. Chapter in S V Prabhath (ed). ‘Women Entrepreneurs in India: challenges and achievements. National Institute of Small Industry Extension. Hyderabad. 2002.
 ‘Dhirubhai Ambani’, ‘GD Birla’, ‘JRD Tata’, ‘MK Gandhi’, ‘N Murty’, ‘Rahul Bajaj’, and ‘Sumantra Ghoshal’. Morgen Witzel (ed). Entries in ‘The Biographical Dictionary of Management’. Thoemmes Press. Bristol, UK. 2001.
 ‘New Maharajas’. Chapter in ‘Footprints of Enterprise – Indian Business Through the Ages’. FICCI. Delhi. 1997.
 ‘JRD Tata and GD Birla’. Chapter in Ayaz Menon (ed). ‘India 50 – the Making of a Nation’. Book Quest. Mumbai. 1997.
 ‘Entrepreneurs and Political Awareness - a Study of Bombay’s Business Groups’. Chapter in Dwijendra Tripathi (ed). ‘Business and Politics – A Historical Perspective’. Indian Institute of Management Ahmedabad. 1991.

Edited
 'Sumantra Ghoshal on Management: a force for good'. Gita Piramal & Julian Birkinshaw (eds). FT Prentice Hall. London. 2005.
 ‘Smart Leadership: insights for CEOs’. Gita Piramal with Jennifer Netarwala (eds). Penguin Books India. Delhi. 2005.

Personal life
Gita Piramal was married in 1985 to businessman Dilip Piramal, chairman and managing director of Blow Plast (VIP Luggage). They have two daughters together, Radhika and Aparna. Radhika is gay and has a wife, Amanda. Aparna, who suffers from bipolar disorder, is married to Amit Raje, a Maratha gentleman, and is the mother of two children. Gita and Dilip were divorced in 2005.

References

External links
Gita Piramal at Penguin India

Living people
Businesswomen from Maharashtra
Indian women historians
20th-century Indian historians
Indian business writers
Women writers from Maharashtra
Rajasthani people
Businesspeople from Mumbai
Businesspeople from London
University of Mumbai alumni
Women business writers
20th-century women writers
1954 births
20th-century Indian women